Dunk is a locality consisting of the Family Islands in the Coral Sea within the Cassowary Coast Region, Queensland, Australia.

Geography
The named islands within the locality include (from north to south):
Mound Island
Dunk Island
Wolngarin Island
Thorpe Island
Bedarra Island (Richards Island)
Wheeler Island
Smith Island
Coombe Island
Bowden Island
Hudson Island

The locality presumably takes its name from the largest island, Dunk Island. The European names of many of the islands reflect the names of the officers on board the survey ship HMS Paluma:  Lieutenant G. Richards, commander; Lieutenants Wheeler, Combe and Bowden-Smith; Dr. Thorpe, surgeon, and Mr. Hudson, engineer.

References 

Cassowary Coast Region
Localities in Queensland